Robyn Marjorie Jane Clarke (born 19 September 1964) is an Australian politician. She is a Labor Party member of the Western Australian Legislative Assembly, representing the seat of Murray-Wellington. She was a sales consultant and small business owner before entering politics.

References

1964 births
Living people
Australian Labor Party members of the Parliament of Western Australia
Australian trade unionists
Members of the Western Australian Legislative Assembly
21st-century Australian politicians
21st-century Australian women politicians
Women members of the Western Australian Legislative Assembly
People from Carlton, Victoria
Politicians from Melbourne